D. spicata may refer to:
 Danthonia spicata, a grass species in the genus Danthonia found in Ohio
 Distichlis spicata, the seashore saltgrass or inland saltgrass, a plant species

See also
 Spicata (disambiguation)